Kevin Rolando Melgar Cardenas (born 19 November 1992) is a Panamanian footballer who plays for Tauro as a goalkeeper.

Club career
He started his career at Alianza and in June 2014 joined Tauro, signing a contract that will keep him 4 seasons with the club.

International career
Melgar made his debut for Panama in a January 2011 UNCAF Nations Cup match against El Salvador and has, as of 10 June 2015, earned a total of 3 caps, scoring no goals.

He latest start for Panama was 10 January 2013, in which was a shutout for him. Panama beat Guatemala that game 3-0, in Panama.

References

External links

1992 births
Living people
Panamanian footballers
Panama international footballers
Association football goalkeepers
Alianza Panama players
2011 Copa Centroamericana players
2011 CONCACAF Gold Cup players
2013 Copa Centroamericana players